"Half of Me" is a 2013 song by Geri Halliwell.

Half of Me may also refer to:

"Half of Me", a song by Chantal Kreviazuk from Plain Jane (2009)
"Half of Me", a song by Rihanna from Unapologetic (2012)
"Half of Me" (Thomas Rhett and Riley Green song), a duet by Thomas Rhett and Riley Green from Rhett's Where We Started (2022)